Eddie Novak (August 3, 1897 – July 1984) was a professional American football player who played wide receiver for five seasons for the Rock Island Independents and Minneapolis Marines.
He is also credited for scoring the first touchdown.

References

1897 births
1984 deaths
American football wide receivers
Rock Island Independents players
Minneapolis Marines players